P.V. Anwar is an Indian politician and businessman, the current MLA of Nilambur, Kerala.

Biography
P. V. Anvar was born in Malappuram district on 26 May 1967, the fourth son of P. V.  Shoukath Ali and Mariyumma. Puthanveettil family is one of the ancient families of Malabar which was very close to the Indian National Congress from the great struggle for independence on. P V Anvar was attracted by the same ideology and still he keeps himself close to it. He completed his schooling at Malabar Christian College School, Kozhikkode, and moved to DGMMES Mampad College where he did his graduation in Economics. He was the college union chairman during his period. After his studies, as an entrepreneur he started PeeVeeaaR Crushers which has grown into one of the prominent crushers in Malabar. He contested from Ernad Constituency as an independent candidate and came second in the run in the assembly elections in 2011.

Political career
P.V. Anwar's family was followers of Indian National Congress (INC). So he was also attracted by the same ideology. He was the college union chairman, and a representative of KSU, the student wing of INC, during his MES Mampad College life. He became an active Congress worker. Later he changed his loyalty to Communist Party of India (Marxist) CPI(M). But his water theme park business got into trouble with the Revenue & forest departments, headed by Communist Party of India (CPI) Ministers. His attempts to woo the CPI, which was the second largest party in the Left Democratic Front, failed and he became a strong opposer of CPI. He contested from Ernad Constituency as an independent candidate with blessings from CPI(M), against the CPI candidate and Congress candidate and came second in the run in the assembly elections 2011. In 2014 Loksabha Election, he contested as an independent candidate against CPI candidate Sathyan Mokeri, in Wayanad (Lok Sabha constituency). Although he got only 37,123 votes, he helped in the victory of Congress candidate M. I. Shanavas, whose victory margin against CPI candidate was only 20,870 votes.
In the 2016 Assembly elections, CPI (M) nominated him LDF candidate from Nilambur constituency. He contested as LDF independent candidate and defeated Congress candidate Aryadan Shoukath, by a margin of 11504 votes.
In 2019 Lok Sabha election, CPI(M) put him as LDF independent candidate from Ponnani Lok Sabha Constituency, against Muslim League candidate E.T. Muhammad Basheer, and lost by 1,93,273 votes.

Personal life
P.V. Anwar is married to Sheeja, and they have three daughters and a son. He also later married Hafsath.

Controversies
As a businessman and politician, P.V. Anwar ended up in lot of controversies, mainly regarding illegal activities like land encroachment and illegal construction.

In May 2018, a probe report by Kozhikode district administration had accused P.V Anwar of illegal construction at Kakkadampoyil water theme park. In his resort, Kozhikode District Collector PV Thomas has accused Anwar of carrying out unauthorized construction at the theme park. The Kerala State Disaster Management Authority has issued a stop memo to the controversial park in June 2018, due to illegal construction. Revenue department ordered to demolish the illegal check dam constructed by P.V. Anvar, for the water theme park. Anvar objected to it and moved to court against the order. But in April 2019, High Court ordered the immediate demolition of the illegal check dam.

P.V. Anvar started a fresh controversy in April 2019, when he accused the Communist Party of India (CPI), whose ministers are holding the Revenue and forest departments in Kerala Government, of trying to destroy his business ventures, by taking legal actions against his water theme Park. CPI protested strongly against his remarks.

The illegal constructions done by PV Anwar accentuated the vagaries caused due to Kerala Floods 2018.

In February 2021, there was huge social media uproar against Africa visit of PV Anwar. A section of netizens came out flooding the comment section of President of Ghana, Nana Akufo-Addo's Facebook page with sarcastic meme demanding release of PV Anwar from Ghana jail. Later PV Anwar came out with a clarification in social media that he is at Sierra Leone for business activities.

References

1967 births
Businesspeople from Kerala
Living people
Malabar Christian College alumni
Members of the Kerala Legislative Assembly
People from Malappuram district